Kondey or Kondē (Dhivehi: ކޮނޑޭ) is one of the inhabited islands of Northern Huvadhu Atoll, administrative code Gaafu Alifu.

The master carpenters of the iconic Male' Hukuru Miskiy were from Kondey, Ali Maavadi Kaleyfaanu and Mahmud Maavadi Kaleyfaanu.

History

Archaeology
This island has large ruins from the historical Maldivian Buddhist era.
Besides the above there are other ruins scattered all over the island. None of them have been properly investigated, although a Makara (sea monster) head in stone was found during Thor Heyerdahl's expedition. Mr. Muhammad Lutfee is seen holding this Makara head in one of the pictures of Thor Heyerdahl's book. The Makara was a common embellishment in classical Hindu and Buddhist temples.

Geography
It is a long wooded island located on Huvadu Atoll's eastern rim.

Demography

References

H. C. P. Bell, The Maldive Islands; Monograph on the History, Archaeology and Epigraphy. Reprint Colombo 1940. Council for Linguistic and Historical Research. Male’ 1989 
Skjølsvold, Arne. 1991. Archaeological Test-Excavations On The Maldive Islands. The Kon-Tiki Museum Occasional Papers, Vol. 2. Oslo
Xavier Romero-Frias, The Maldive Islanders, A Study of the Popular Culture of an Ancient Ocean Kingdom. Barcelona 1999,  

Islands of the Maldives